Plagiobothrys kingii is a species of flowering plant in the borage family known by the common name Great Basin popcornflower. It is native to the Great Basin and Mojave Desert of the United States, where it grows in desert and plateau scrub habitat, among saltbush and on rocky slopes and flats.

Description
Plagiobothrys kingii is an annual herb growing mostly upright or erect and just a few centimeters tall to a maximum height around 40 centimeters. It is hairy in texture, the hairs coarse and rough. The leaves are alternately arranged along the stem and no more than 6 centimeters long. The inflorescence is a series of tiny white flowers each 4 to 7 millimeters wide. The fruit is a tiny arched, ribbed nutlet.

External links
Jepson Manual Treatment: Plagiobothrys kingii
Plagiobothrys kingii Photo gallery

kingii
Flora of the California desert regions
Flora of the Great Basin
Natural history of the Mojave Desert
Taxa named by Asa Gray
Flora without expected TNC conservation status